TAUK is an American four-piece progressive rock-fusion band from Oyster Bay, New York.

Tauk (pronounced "talk", shortened from Montauk, NY) has toured with Umphrey's McGee, Disco Biscuits, Papadosio, STS9, The String Cheese Incident, and others. The group tours the United States regularly every year, averaging about 160 shows. In 2015, the group released Headroom, the band's first double-CD set culled from live performances. Much of their recording is done in collaboration with engineer Robert Carranza, who has produced three of their studio albums.

History 
Band members Matt Jalbert, Charlie Dolan, and A.C. Carter began playing together while growing up on Long Island as teenagers. Dolan, Jalbert, and Carter formed their first band in seventh grade. The group initially had a vocalist, Alessandro Zanelli, who left the group in 2011 and was not replaced; they have worked as an instrumental group since. Isaac Teel entered the band later when he met Dolan in college. The group won its first major attention opening on tour for Umphrey's McGee in 2014.

Members 

Current
Matt Jalbert (guitar)
Charlie Dolan (bass)
A.C. Carter (keyboards and organ)
Isaac Teel (drums)

Former
Alessandro Zanelli - vocals

Discography

Studio Albums

Ride (before 2005)
Brokedown King (2010)
Homunculus (2013)
Collisions (2014)
Sir Nebula (2016)
Shapeshifter II: Outbreak (2018)
Chaos Companion (2021)

Live Albums

 Headroom (2015)
Real Tauk, Vol.1 (2018)
Real Tauk, Vol.2 (2019)
Real Tauk, Vol.3 (2019)

EPs

Shapeshifter I: Construct (2018)
Pull Factors (2011)

Singles

 Horizon (2016)
 Realize (2017)
 Space Ghost (2017)
 Revenge of Weenus (2017)
 Premises (2018)
 Convoy (2018) 
 CMF 9000 (2018)
 Checkmate (2018)
 Come On Now (2020)
Moon Dub (2021)

References

External links
AC and Matt feature interview on The Sound Podcast with Ira Haberman



American jazz ensembles from New York (state)
Jazz fusion ensembles
Musical groups from Long Island